Gillespie Run is a  long 3rd order tributary to the Youghiogheny River in Allegheny County, Pennsylvania.

Course
Gillespie Run rises about 2 miles west-southwest of Mustard, Pennsylvania, and then flows northeasterly to join the Youghiogheny River across from Sutersville.

Watershed
Gillespie Run drains  of area, receives about 39.5 in/year of precipitation, has a wetness index of 318.16, and is about 62% forested.

References

 
Tributaries of the Ohio River
Rivers of Pennsylvania
Rivers of Allegheny County, Pennsylvania
Allegheny Plateau